Children of the Night is a 1985 American made-for-television drama film directed by Robert Markowitz. The film is a fictionalized biopic of Dr. Lois Lee, following her work among young prostitutes in Hollywood and the organization Children of the Night that she founded as a result.

Plot

Cast 
Kathleen Quinlan as Lois Lee
Nicholas Campbell as Larry
Mario Van Peebles as Roy Spanish
Lar Park Lincoln as Valerie
Wallace Langham as Kevin
Eddie Velez as Tom
David L. Crowley as Marty
Donald Hotton as Dr. Norris
Marta Kober as Linda
Laura Esterman as Arlene
Sherri Stone as Brandy
Michael Shaner as Jerry
Vincent J. Isaac as Jink
Michelle Ann Martin as Ginger
Monica Calhoun as Wanda
Zoe Trilling as Melody
Helene Udy as Dallas
Valerie Richards as Zoe
George Spaventa as Robert Ringen

Soundtrack 
 Pat Benatar - "Hell is for Children"

References

External links 

 Review & WFMO

1985 television films
1985 films
1980s biographical drama films
American biographical drama films
American films based on plays
Films about runaways
Films directed by Robert Markowitz
Films set in Los Angeles
Films scored by Miles Goodman
American drama television films
1980s English-language films
1980s American films